Currency strength expresses the value of currency. For economists, it is often calculated as purchasing power, while for financial traders, it can be described as an indicator, reflecting many factors related to the currency; for example, fundamental data, overall economic performance (stability) or interest rates. It can also be calculated from currency in relation to other currencies, usually using a pre-defined currency basket. A typical example of this method is the U.S. Dollar Index (USDX).

Currency strength based trading indicators
There are two types of currency strength calculations: fundamental based, and price based. 

Generally, price based currency strength is calculated from the USDX, which is used as a reference for other currency indexes. The basic idea behind indicators is "to buy strong currency and to sell weak currency". If X/Y currency pair is up trend, it can be determined whether this happens due to X's strength or Y's weakness. For the calculation of indexes of this kind, major currencies are usually used because they represent up to 90% of the whole forex market volume.

In the minority of cases, fundamental based currency strength (also known as macro currency strength) is calculated from aggregating various leading economic reports, including but not exclusive to: ISM Reports, Consumer Surveys (UMCSI), Interest Rates, and much more.

With indicators like above, one is able to choose the most valuable pair to trade; see the reactions of each currency on moves in correlated instruments (for example CAD/OIL or AUD/GOLD); look for a strong trend in one currency; and observe most of the forex market in one chart.  The current trend in currency strength indicators is to combine more currency indexes in order to make forex movements easily visible.

Examples
Typical examples of indicators based on currency strength are relative currency strength and absolute currency strength (percentage). Their combination is called the "Forex Flow indicator", because one can see the whole currency flow across the forex market.

See also
 Relative currency strength
 Absolute currency strength
 Balance of trade
 Technical analysis
 Hard currency
 Revaluation

References

Technical analysis
Strength
Foreign exchange market